Md. Rashed Amin OSP, rcds, ndc, psc is a retired major general of the Bangladesh Army. He was appointed to the Senior Directing Staff (SDS, Army) at the National Defense College in December 2021. He served as the general officer commanding the 7th Infantry Division and 33rd Infantry Divisions.

Career 
Amin was commissioned on 25 December 1986 with 15th BMA Long course. 

In his service years he worked as faculty at the National Defence College. He was patron of the Bangladesh Professional Golfers Association. 

Amin was command the armored brigade of the 11th Infantry Division, based in Bogra Cantonment, when he was promoted to the rank of major general in October 2016. He was appointed the general officer commanding the 33rd Infantry Division based in Comilla Cantonment. During his Leave Pending Retirement in 2021, he was appointed to the Senior Directing Staff SDS (Army) at National Defence College. He belongs to an army family of three generations. His only son is also serving as an officer in the Armoured Corps.

References 

Living people
Bangladesh Army generals
Bangladeshi male golfers
Year of birth missing (living people)
National Defence College (Bangladesh) alumni